Amusaron is a genus of moths of the family Bombycidae. The genus was erected by Thierry Bouyer in 2008.

Selected species
Amusaron kolga (Druce, 1887)
Amusaron pruinosa (Grünberg, 1907)

References

Bombycidae